Jay Maisel (born January 18, 1931) is an American photographer.

His awards include the Art Directors Club Hall of Fame, the Lifetime Achievement Award from the American Society of Media Photographers, and the Infinity Award from the International Center of Photography.

Biography
Maisel (pronounced may'-zel') was born on January 18, 1931, in Brooklyn, New York City and attended Abraham Lincoln High School where he studied under Leon Friend. He studied painting and graphic design at Manhattan's Cooper Union and at Yale University, and became a photographer in 1954.

One of Maisel's most notable images is his photograph of Miles Davis that appears on the cover of Davis's album Kind of Blue (1959). In 2009, Andy Baio commissioned an image based on the original Kind of Blue album cover for the cover of a chiptune tribute album titled Kind of Bloop. Attorneys representing Maisel demanded damages and that the resulting image be removed from the chiptune album, resulting in an out-of-court settlement of $32,500 from Baio.

For almost 50 years Maisel lived with his family in the historic Germania Bank Building on the Bowery in lower Manhattan. Built in 1898, the  building contains 72 rooms over six floors. Maisel purchased the building in 1966 for $102,000 when the neighborhood was in severe decline. He used it as a single-family residence and studio. The building's value was estimated at $30 to $50 million in 2008. New York magazine called it "maybe the greatest real-estate coup of all time". It cost $300,000 annually to maintain, including heat and taxes. In February 2015, the building was sold for $55 million to developer Aby Rosen. A 2019 film, Jay Myself, documents Maisel's life and his move from the building. 

Maisel's new residence, a nearly 27-foot-wide townhouse in a Brooklyn historic district, is three stories tall with a full, finished basement; it has six bedrooms, six full baths and two half-baths and an elevator, over about 10,000 square feet of space. The annual taxes on the house, which had a $16 million asking price, are $22,548.68.

Awards
Art Directors Club Hall of Fame
Lifetime Achievement Award from the American Society of Media Photographers
Infinity Award from the International Center of Photography
In 2020 Maisel was inducted into the International Photography Hall of Fame and Museum.

References

External links

1931 births
Living people
American photographers
Artists from Brooklyn